The  2018 Estonian Small Cup was the 9th season of the Estonian amateur football knockout tournament. The tournament began in March 2018, and the final took place in September 2018 at the A. Le Coq Arena, Tallinn. Paide Linnameeskond III were the defending champions.

Saue JK won the cup after beating Raasiku FC Joker 2–0 in the final.

First Round (1/64)
The draw was made by Estonian Football Association on 9 March 2018.
League level of the club in the brackets.
Rahvaliiga RL (people's league) is a league organized by Estonian Football Association, but not part of the main league system.

Byes
These teams were not drawn and secured a place in the second round without playing:
 II Liiga (4): Raasiku FC Joker, Paide Linnameeskond III, Tõrva JK, Maardu United, Tartu FC Santos II, Pärnu JK Poseidon, Tallinna JK Legion II, Põhja-Tallinna JK Volta, Türi Ganvix JK, Tallinna JK Piraaja, Tallinna FC Ararat TTÜ
 III Liiga (5): FC Sillamäe, FC Zenit Tallinn, FC Vastseliina, JK Retro, Põhja-Sakala, Tallinna JK Augur, EMÜ SK, JK Loo, Tallinna FC Eston Villa, FC Kose, Anija JK, SK Imavere, Viljandi JK Tulevik III, Nõmme Kalju FC III, FC Järva-Jaani, JK Kernu Kadakas, Valga FC Warrior, Kohila Püsivus, FC Elva II, Pärnu JK Poseidon II, Tartu FC Helios, Ambla Vallameeskond, Tallinna FC Hell Hunt, Saue JK, Rumori Calcio Tallinn
 IV Liiga (6): Maarjamäe FC Igiliikur, Vaimastvere SK Illi, Märjamaa Kompanii, FC Tallinn, Pakri SK Alexela, Tartu JK Tammeka IV, Rummu Dünamo, Tallinna FC TransferWise, Tallinna FC Zapoos, FC Jõgeva Wolves, Põhja-Tallinna JK Volta II, Tallinna JK Jalgpallihaigla, Tallinna FC Reaal, Tartu FC Loomaaed, Maardu United II, FC Toompea, Tartu FC Helios II, Tallinna Depoo
 Rahvaliiga (RL): Maksatransport,  FC Tallinna Wolves, Bro Era, Tatikad Platsil, Kohtla-Nõmme, Viimsi Lõvid, Kohtla-Järve SK Zenit

Second Round (1/32)
The draw was made by Estonian Football Association on 2 April 2018.
League level of the club in the brackets.
Rahvaliiga RL (people's league) is a league organized by Estonian Football Association, but not part of the main league system.

Third Round (1/16)
The draw was made by Estonian Football Association on 26 April 2018.
League level of the club in the brackets.
Rahvaliiga RL (people's league) is a league organized by Estonian Football Association, but not part of the main league system.

Fourth Round (1/8)
The draw was made by Estonian Football Association on 23 May 2018.
League level of the club in the brackets.
Rahvaliiga RL (people's league) is a league organized by Estonian Football Association, but not part of the main league system.

Quarter-finals
The draw was made on 15 June 2018.

Semi-finals
The draw was made on 2 August 2018.

Final
The two finalist were Saue JK, who reached quarter-finals the previous season, and Raasiku FC Joker, who enjoyed third-tier football last year. Both teams are from Harju County.

See also
 2017 Meistriliiga
 2017 Esiliiga
 2017 Esiliiga B
 2017-18 Estonian Cup

References

External links
 Official website 

2018
Cup